Hippocampus jugumus, the collared seahorse, was described in 2001 from a single specimen found in the waters surrounding Lord Howe Island.

References 

jugumus
Taxa named by Rudie Hermann Kuiter
Fish described in 2001